The black-headed myzomela (Myzomela melanocephala) is a bird of the family Meliphagidae endemic to the central Solomon Islands.

References

black-headed myzomela
Birds of Guadalcanal
Endemic birds of the Solomon Islands
black-headed myzomela
Taxonomy articles created by Polbot